Boone Dam is a hydroelectric and flood control dam on the South Fork Holston River on the border between Sullivan County and Washington County in the U.S. state of Tennessee.  It is one of three dams on the South Fork Holston owned and operated by the Tennessee Valley Authority, which built the dam in the early 1950s as part of greater efforts to control flooding in the Tennessee River watershed.  The dam impounds the  Boone Lake, and its tailwaters are part of Fort Patrick Henry Lake.  The dam and associated infrastructure were listed on the National Register of Historic Places in 2017.
 
Boone Dam is named for frontiersman Daniel Boone (1734-1820), who was active in the general area in the 1760s.

Location

The Watauga River joins the South Fork Holston almost immediately upstream from the dam, creating a V-shaped reservoir that extends for  up the South Fork Holston (all the way to Bluff City) and for  up the Watauga. The Sullivan-Washington county line follows the reservoir for most of its Watauga span.

Capacity

While the main section of the dam is a concrete structure, the northern half of the dam consists of a  earth-and-fill structure that seals off the floodplain adjacent to the main river channel.

Background and construction

Both public and private entities were aware of the hydroelectric potential of the South Fork Holston River in the early 1900s, although other than Wilbur Dam (completed in 1912) on the river's Watauga River tributary, no major dam projects were attempted.  In the 1920s, the Holston River Power Company surveyed the river basin with plans to build four dams, and identified the present Boone site (the company called it the "Bachman Ford" site).  In the 1930s, when the Tennessee Valley Authority assumed oversight of flood control operations in the Tennessee River watershed, the agency suggested the Boone site (the agency originally called it the "Spurgeon Island" site) as a potential dam site.  As Watauga Dam and South Holston Dam (further upstream) neared completion in the late 1940s, the Spurgeon Island site was the next logical step in development of the South Fork Holston.  The project's primary purpose was to provide flood control in the region, especially for Kingsport (a few miles downstream), which had suffered major flood damage in 1901 and 1940.  The dam would also add hydroelectricity to TVA's energy grid, which by 1950 had been maxed out by increasing demands from consumers and from Atomic Energy Commission facilities at Oak Ridge.  Work on Boone Dam began August 29, 1950.

The outbreak of the Korean War brought increased support from federal entities, and work progressed without interruption.

Boone Dam was completed and its gates closed December 16, 1952.  The dam's first generator went online March 16, 1953, its second generator went online June 12, 1953, and the third went online September 3, 1953.  The total cost of the Boone project was $27.7 million.

Sinkhole

On October 20, 2014, during an informal inspection, a sinkhole was discovered at the toe of the dam that allowed water to seep through. Consequently, a decision was made to start lowering the water level in the lake earlier than normal as a cautionary measure.

On July 30, 2015, a media briefing was held discussing the results of a formal inspection of the dam.  Internal erosion was found to be the cause of the seepage.  A wide range of methods of repairing the dam were considered.  A composite seepage barrier was the preferred option.  After impact studies have been conducted, work is likely to begin on the repair in early 2016 and may take 5 to 7 years to complete.  The repair will cost two hundred to three hundred million dollars.

References

External links

Boone Reservoir — official TVA site
Boone Reservoir – Tennessee Wildlife Resources Agency

Holston River
Dams in Tennessee
Tennessee Valley Authority dams
Buildings and structures in Sullivan County, Tennessee
Buildings and structures in Washington County, Tennessee
Hydroelectric power plants in Tennessee
Dams completed in 1952
Energy infrastructure completed in 1952
Dams on the National Register of Historic Places in Tennessee
National Register of Historic Places in Sullivan County, Tennessee
National Register of Historic Places in Washington County, Tennessee
1952 establishments in Tennessee